Daniel, Dan or Danny Cameron may refer to:

Politicians
Daniel Alexander Cameron  (1870–1937), Canadian politician from the province of Nova Scotia
Daniel R. Cameron (1885–1933), lumber merchant and political figure in Nova Scotia, Canada
Daniel Cameron (Australian politician), member of the Victorian Legislative Assembly, 1856–1859
Daniel Cameron (American politician) (1985), Kentucky Attorney General
Danny Cameron (politician) (1924–2009), Leader of the Opposition in the Legislative Assembly of New Brunswick, Canada

Others
Colonel Daniel Cameron
Dan Cameron, art curator
Danny Cameron (footballer) (born 1953), Scottish footballer

See also